Major General Robert Walker Grow (February 14, 1895 – November 3, 1985) was a senior United States Army officer who commanded the 6th Armored Division during World War II. He was notable for his court-martial in 1951 for failing to safeguard classified information.

Early life and military career
Born in Sibley, Iowa to Nellie (née Walker) and John Thomas Grow. His mother died when he was two years old and Grow went to live with his paternal grandparents, as his father went to Canada to work. He graduated from the University of Minnesota in 1916.  He married Mary Louella Marshall (1896-1974), daughter of Willamina H. "Willie" (née Robertson) and J Walter Marshall, of Cleveland, Tennessee on November 5, 1917, in Hamilton, Tennessee. They had two sons, Robert Marshall and Walter Thomas, both attendees of the United States Military Academy at West Point, New York. They had an additional child die as a one-day-old in Brownsville, Texas.

Grow joined the Minnesota National Guard in February 1914, whilst attending the University of Minnesota, and was commissioned as an officer in November 1915. On December 5, 1916, he was promoted to first lieutenant. April 1917 saw the American entry into World War I and Grow was promoted again, this time to captain, in the National Army on August 5, 1917. On October 12, he transferred to the Regular Army but retained his captain rank. Grow did not see active service during World War I.

He remained in the army during the interwar period, attending both the United States Army Command and General Staff College and the United States Army War College.

Robert W. Grow was the commander the 6th Armored Division on the Western Front, fighting during the battles of Normandy and of the Bulge.

His command of the 6th Armored Division in its rapid assault across the Brittany Peninsula is considered one of the finest examples of armor in the exploitation phase. This stunning advance is often overlooked due to the more glamorous exploits of the rest of the U.S. Army surrounding the German Seventh Army at the same time.

After the war
He is also known for being court-martialed in 1951 during the Cold War on charges of failing to safeguard classified information. At the time, he was the senior U.S. military attache in Moscow, and portions of his diary fell into Soviet hands. Grow retired after the court-martial and later became an executive of the Falls Church, Virginia chamber of commerce.He was reprimanded and suspended from command for six months. Only after the trial did the public discover that many of the sentiments that Squires attributed to Grow were forgeries. The case was appealed and ultimately came before President Eisenhower in 1957, who approved the findings but remitted the sentence. 

Not long after the court-martial, his son, Walter Thomas Grow, was on summer vacation from the United States Military Academy at West Point in 1953 when a fire started in his bedroom of the family home in Falls Church, Virginia.  Walter Thomas Grow, 21, died of smoke inhalation on August 12, 1953.

References

External links
Generals of World War II

|-

|-

1895 births
1985 deaths
United States Army Cavalry Branch personnel
United States Army Field Artillery Branch personnel
Cold War espionage
United States Army personnel who were court-martialed
Burials at Arlington National Cemetery
People from Sibley, Iowa
United States Army personnel of World War I
United States Army generals of World War II
United States Army generals
Recipients of the Distinguished Service Cross (United States)
Recipients of the Distinguished Service Medal (US Army)
Recipients of the Silver Star
Recipients of the Legion of Merit
United States Army Command and General Staff College alumni
United States Army War College alumni
Military personnel from Iowa